Purísima Concepción, was a Spanish first-rate ship of the line of the Kingdom of Spain's Armada Real in service between 1779 and 1810.

Commission and construction 

The name Purísima Concepción translates into English directly as Immaculate Conception, a religious reference to the veneration of the Virgin Mary. The names of contemporary Spanish ships commonly had religious undertones as with general Spanish naming traditions of the period.

Purísima Concepción was laid down on 29 February 1779 at the Royal Dockyards at Ferrol, Province of A Coruña, Galicia. She was designed by Spanish naval architect Francisco Gautier and constructed by José Joaquím Romero Fernández de Landa. She was launched on 24 December 1779 and handed over to the Armada Real. She was completed and commissioned in 1780.

Service 

Purísima Concepción was recorded as having been at Cádiz in 1780, her first action involved attachment to the 3rd Franco-Spanish fleet for the Campaign of the English Channel.

On 9 August 1780, Purísima Concepción was part of the Spanish fleet that captured a British convoy of 52 ships under the command of Admiral Luis de Córdova y Córdova and Vice Admiral Jose de Mazarredo y Salazar.

On 5 October 1781, Purísima Concepción was anchored at Cádiz.

In 1782, Purísima Concepción supported Spanish actions at Gibraltar during the Great Siege of Gibraltar and was back at Cádiz on 15 April 1782.

On 22 October 1782, Purísima Concepción was one of 38 ships of the line of the Spanish fleet at the Battle of Cape Spartel though she did not see any action that day.

In 1784, Purísima Concepción was sailed from Cádiz to Cartagena where she was ordered set in commission. On 13 August 1784, she left Cartagena in a patrol squadron together with the sixth-rate, 24 gun frigate  returning to Cádiz. The following day, 14 August, Purisima Concepción assisted Santa Gertrudis in the capture of a 14-gun Algerian vessel. The action lasted around a half-hour beginning when Purísima Concepción opened fire on the Algerian ship at around 10 o'clock in the morning. The Algerian vessel was boarded around a half-hour later resulting in the smaller vessel's capitulation. The Algerian vessel had four heavy cannons, two deck-mounted guns and eight swivel guns. On 15 August, Purísima Concepción arrived in Cádiz together with the Gertrudis and their Algerian prize vessel.

In early February 1793, Purísima Concepción arrived at Cartagena for commissioning and soon after returned to Cádiz. On 23 February 1793, she sailed from Cádiz with 6 other ships of the line to Cartagena where they would join the Siege of Toulon. On 2 October 1793, the fleet left Cartagena bound for Toulon, arriving in the theater on 21 October to join the combined British-Spanish fleet. After the victory at Toulon on 19 December, Purísima Concepción left on 25 December bound for Cartagena, arriving on 31 December 1793.

On 3 March 1795, Purísima Concepción was at Cádiz.

On 26 June 1796, Purísima Concepción was at Cartagena. While docked, a fire broke out on the ship but it was extinguished by the crew before causing significant damage.

In 1797, Purísima Concepción was at Cádiz and was trapped there by the British blockade of the port. Spain eventually prevailed in the battle. On 14 February 1797, she took part in the Second Battle of Cape St Vincent. She was the flagship for the second Spanish squadron. Her commander was Lieutenant-General Francisco Javier Morales de los Ríos and her Flag Captain & Brigadier was José Escaño. The Spanish fleet was commanded by Admiral José de Córdoba y Ramos. During the action, she suffered 8 killed and 21 wounded. The Spanish defeat at Cape St. Vincent enabled the British Royal Navy under Admiral Horatio Nelson back into the Mediterranean Sea.

In 1800, Purísima Concepción was attached to the Spanish fleet in the Second Campaign of the English Channel. Later in the year she was blockaded by the British Fleet under Rear Admiral John Colpoys at Brest. She remained blockaded at Brest until 1801.

In 1808, Purísima Concepción was careened at Ferrol and sailed from Ferrol to Cádiz later in the year when the process was complete.

In 1809, Purísima Concepción was at Cádiz.

In 1810, Purísima Concepción was at Cádiz. On 6 March, a big storm swept the harbor at Cádiz. On 7 March, Purísima Concepción lost her anchors and ran ashore on the French occupied Spanish coast. On 8 August 1810, Purísima Concepción was under heavy shot from French warships and land forces. On 9 August, she was burned by French troops and sunk off the coast. At the time of the loss, the ship was under the command of Rafael Mastre.

Commanders

References

Bibliography 
 threedecks.org

Ships of the Spanish Navy
1779 ships
Ships built in Spain
Maritime incidents in 1810
Shipwrecks in the Atlantic Ocean
Shipwrecks of Spain